Centralia is a borough and near-ghost town in Columbia County, Pennsylvania, United States. It is part of Northeastern Pennsylvania. Its population has declined from 1,000 in 1980 to five residents in 2020 because a coal mine fire has been burning beneath the borough since 1962. Centralia, part of the Bloomsburg–Berwick metropolitan area, is the least-populated municipality in Pennsylvania. It is completely surrounded by Conyngham Township.

All real estate in the borough was claimed under eminent domain in 1992 and condemned by the Commonwealth of Pennsylvania. Centralia's ZIP code was discontinued by the Postal Service in 2002. State and local officials reached an agreement with the seven remaining residents on October 29, 2013, allowing them to remain in Centralia until their deaths, after which the rights to their houses will be taken through eminent domain.

History

Early history
Many of the Native American tribes in what is now Columbia County sold the land that makes up Centralia to colonial agents in 1749 for £500. In 1770, during the construction of the Reading Road, which stretched from Reading to Fort Augusta (present-day Sunbury), settlers surveyed and explored the land. A large portion of the Reading Road was developed later as Route 61, the main highway east into and south out of Centralia.

In 1793, Robert Morris, a hero of the Revolutionary War and a signatory of the Declaration of Independence, acquired a third of Centralia's valley land. When he declared bankruptcy in 1798, the land was surrendered to the Bank of the United States. A French sea captain named Stephen Girard purchased Morris' lands for $30,000, including 68 tracts east of Morris'. He had learned that there was anthracite coal in the region.

The Centralia coal deposits were largely overlooked before the construction of the Mine Run Railroad in 1854. In 1832, Johnathan Faust opened the Bull's Head Tavern in what was called Roaring Creek Township; this gave the town its first name, Bull's Head. In 1842, Centralia's land was bought by the Locust Mountain Coal and Iron Company. Alexander Rae, a mining engineer, moved his family in and began planning a village, laying out streets and lots for development. Rae named the town Centreville, but in 1865 changed it to Centralia because the U.S. Post Office already had a Centreville in Schuylkill County. The Mine Run Railroad was built in 1854 to transport coal out of the valley.

Mining begins 

The first two mines in Centralia opened in 1856, the Locust Run Mine and the Coal Ridge Mine. Afterward came the Hazeldell Colliery Mine in 1860, the Centralia Mine in 1862, and the Continental Mine in 1863. The Continental was located on Stephen Girard's former estate. Branching from the Lehigh Valley Railroad, the Lehigh and Mahanoy Railroad was constructed to Centralia in 1865; it enabled transport and expansion of Centralia's coal sales to markets in eastern Pennsylvania.

Centralia was incorporated as a borough in 1866. Its principal employer was the anthracite coal industry. Alexander Rae, the town's founder, was murdered in his buggy by members of the Molly Maguires on October 17, 1868, during a trip between Centralia and Mount Carmel. Three men were eventually convicted of his death and were hanged in the county seat of Bloomsburg, on March 25, 1878.

Several other murders and incidents of arson also took place during the violence, as Centralia was a hotbed of Molly Maguires activity during the 1860s to organize a mineworkers union in order to improve wages and working conditions. A legend among locals in Centralia tells that Father Daniel Ignatius McDermott, the first Roman Catholic priest to call Centralia home, cursed the land in retaliation for being assaulted by three members of the Maguires in 1869. McDermott said that there would be a day when St. Ignatius Roman Catholic Church would be the only structure remaining in Centralia. Many of the Molly Maguires' leaders were hanged in 1877, ending their crimes. Legends say that a number of descendants of the Molly Maguires still lived in Centralia up until the 1980s.

According to numbers of Federal census records, the town of Centralia reached its maximum population of 2,761 in 1890. At its peak, the town had seven churches, five hotels, 27 saloons, two theaters, a bank, a post office, and 14 general and grocery stores. Thirty-seven years later the production of anthracite coal had reached its peak in Pennsylvania. In the following years, production declined, as many young miners from Centralia enlisted in the military when the US entered World War I.

The Wall Street Crash of 1929 resulted in the Lehigh Valley Coal Company closing five of its Centralia-local mines. Bootleg miners continued mining in several idle mines, using techniques such as what was called "pillar-robbing," where miners would extract coal from coal pillars left in mines to support their roofs. This caused the collapse of many idle mines, further complicating the prevention of the mine fire in 1962. Efforts to seal off the abandoned mines ran into the collapsed areas.

In 1950, Centralia Council acquired the rights to all anthracite coal beneath Centralia through a state law passed in 1949 that enabled the transaction. That year, the federal census counted 1,986 residents in Centralia.

Coal mining continued in Centralia until the 1960s, when most of the companies shut down. Bootleg mining continued until 1982, and strip and open-pit mining are still active in the area. An underground mine about three miles to the west employs about 40 people.

Rail service ended in 1966. Centralia operated its own school district, including elementary schools and a high school. There were also two Catholic parochial schools. By 1980, it had 1,012 residents. Another 500 or 600 lived nearby.

Mine fire

Triggers
Analysts disagree about the specific cause of the Centralia fire. David Dekok, author of Fire Underground: The Ongoing Tragedy of the Centralia Mine Fire, concluded that it started with an attempt to clean up the town landfill. In May 1962, the Centralia Borough Council hired five members of the volunteer fire company to clean up the town landfill, located in an abandoned strip-mine pit next to the Odd Fellows Cemetery just outside the borough limits. This had been done prior to Memorial Day in previous years, when the landfill was in a different location.

On May 27, 1962, the firefighters, as they had in the past, set the dump on fire and let it burn for some time. Unlike in previous years, however, the fire was not fully extinguished. An unsealed opening in the pit allowed the fire to enter the labyrinth of abandoned coal mines beneath Centralia.

By contrast, other sources claim that the fire had started the previous day, when a trash hauler dumped hot ash or coal discarded from coal burners into the open trash pit. The author of The Day the Earth Caved In noted that borough council minutes from June 4, 1962, referred to two fires at the dump and that five firefighters had submitted bills for "fighting the fire at the landfill area." The borough, by law, was responsible for installing a fire-resistant clay barrier between each layer of the landfill, but fell behind schedule, leaving the barrier incomplete. This allowed the hot coals to penetrate the coal seam underneath the pit and start the subsequent subterranean fire.

Another theory proposes that the Bast Colliery fire of 1932 was never fully extinguished, and that fire reached the landfill area by 1962; however, a miner named Frank Jurgill Sr. disputes that theory. Jurgill claims he operated a bootleg mine with his brother near the landfill from 1960 to 1962. If the Bast Colliery fire had not been extinguished, the brothers would likely have been overcome or killed by the noxious gases via many interconnected tunnels in the area.

Immediate effects
In 1979, locals became aware of the scale of the problem when a gas-station owner, then-mayor John Coddington, inserted a dipstick into one of his underground tanks to check the fuel level. When he withdrew it, it seemed hot.

His cousin, 14-year-old Eric Wolfgang, pulled Domboski out of the hole and saved his life. The plume of hot steam billowing from the hole was tested and found to contain a lethal level of carbon monoxide. At the time of the sinkhole collapse, then-incumbent Rep. James Nelligan and Governor Dick Thornburgh were visiting the town to assess the area.

Although there was physical, visible evidence of the fire, residents of Centralia were bitterly divided over the question of whether or not the fire posed a direct threat to the town. In The Real Disaster is Above Ground, Steve Kroll-Smith and Steve Couch identified at least six community groups, each organized around varying interpretations of the amount and kind of risk posed by the fire. In 1983, the U.S. Congress allocated more than $42 million for relocation efforts. Nearly all of the residents accepted the government's buyout offers. More than 1,000 people moved out of the town and 500 structures were demolished. By 1990, the census recorded 63 remaining residents.

In 1992, Pennsylvania governor Bob Casey invoked eminent domain on all property in the borough, condemning all the buildings within. A subsequent legal effort by residents to overturn the action failed. In 2002, the U.S. Postal Service discontinued Centralia's ZIP code, 17927. Only 16 homes were still standing by 2006, which was reduced to eleven by 2009 when Governor Ed Rendell began the formal eviction of the remaining Centralia residents. Only five homes remained by 2010.

The Centralia mine fire extended beneath the village of Byrnesville, a short distance to the south, and required it also to be abandoned.

Condemnation and abandonment

Few homes remain standing in Centralia. Most of the abandoned buildings have been demolished by the Columbia County Redevelopment Authority or reclaimed by nature. At a casual glance, the area now appears to be a field with many paved streets running through it. Some areas are being filled with new-growth forest. The remaining church in the borough, St. Mary's, holds weekly services on Sunday. It has not yet been directly affected by the fire. The town's four cemeteries—including one on the hilltop that has smoke rising around and out of it—are maintained in good condition.

The only indications of the fire, which underlies some  spreading along four fronts, are low round metal steam vents in the south of the borough. Several signs warn of underground fire, unstable ground, and dangerous levels of carbon monoxide. Additional smoke and steam can be seen coming from an abandoned portion of Pennsylvania Route 61, the area just behind the hilltop cemetery, and other cracks in the ground scattered about the area. Route 61 was repaired several times until it was closed.

The current route was formerly a detour around the damaged portion during the repairs and became a permanent route in 1993; mounds of dirt were placed at both ends of the former route, effectively blocking the road. Pedestrian traffic is still possible due to a small opening about two feet wide at the north side of the road. The underground fire is still burning and may continue to do so for 250 years.  The Commonwealth of Pennsylvania did not renew the relocation contract at the end of 2005.

The last remaining house on Locust Avenue was demolished in September 2007. It was notable for a period for the five chimney-like support buttresses along each of two opposite sides of the house. The house had formerly been supported by a row of adjacent buildings. Another house with similar buttresses was visible from the northern side of the cemetery, just north of the burning, partially subsumed hillside.

Residents John Comarnisky and John Lokitis, Jr. were evicted in May and July 2009, respectively. In May 2009, the remaining residents mounted another legal effort to reverse the 1992 eminent domain claim. In 2010, only five homes remained as state officials tried to vacate the remaining residents and demolish what was left of the town. In March 2011, a federal judge refused to issue an injunction that would have stopped the condemnation.

The Borough Council still had regular meetings . It was reported that the town's highest bill at the meeting reported on came from PPL Corporation, a power utility, at $92 and the town's budget was "in the black."

In February 2012, the Commonwealth Court ruled that a declaration of taking could not be re-opened or set aside on the basis that the purpose for the condemnation no longer exists; seven people, including the Borough Council president, had filed suit claiming the condemnation was no longer needed because the underground fire had moved and the air quality in the borough was the same as that in Lancaster. In October 2013, the remaining residents settled their lawsuit, receiving $218,000 in compensation for the value of their homes, along with $131,500 to settle additional claims, and the right to stay in their homes for the rest of their lives.

In April 2020, amidst the early part of the COVID-19 pandemic, the property's current owners made the decision to cover over the graffiti highway section of old Route 61. Several mounds of dirt were laid over the area, thus ending a decades-long fascination with the desolate stretch of road.

Time capsule
The town's residents and former residents decided to open a time capsule buried in 1966 a couple of years earlier than planned after someone had attempted to unearth and steal the capsule in May 2014. The capsule was not scheduled to be opened until 2016 (50 years after it was buried).

Mineral rights
Several current and former Centralia residents believe the state's eminent domain claim was a plot to gain the mineral rights to the anthracite coal beneath the borough. Residents have asserted its value to be in the hundreds of millions of dollars, although the exact amount of coal is not known.

This theory is based on the municipality laws of the state. According to state law, when the municipality can no longer form a functioning municipal government, i.e., when there are no longer any residents, the borough legally ceases to exist. At that point, the mineral rights, which are owned by the Borough of Centralia (they are not privately held) would revert to the ownership of the Commonwealth of Pennsylvania.

Demographics
A sizeable minority of the population historically have been of Ukrainian or Russian descent, with the town once having both a Ukrainian Greek Catholic church (built 1911, still standing) and a Russian Orthodox church (built 1916, demolished 1986).

2000 census
As of the census of 2000, there were 21 people, ten households, and seven families residing in the borough. The racial makeup of the borough was 100% white.

There were ten households, out of which one (10%) had children under the age of 18 living with them, five (50%) were married couples living together, one had a female householder with no partner present, and three (30%) were non-families. Three of the households were made up of individuals, and one had someone living alone who was 65 years of age or older. The average household size was 2.10, and the average family size was 2.57.

In the borough the population was spread out, with one resident under the age of 18, one from 18 to 24, four from 25 to 44, seven from 45 to 64, and eight who were 65 years of age or older. The median age was 62 years. There were ten females and 11 males with one male under the age of 18.

The median income for a household in the borough was $23,750, and the median income for a family was $28,750. The per capita income for the borough was $16,083. All of the population was below the poverty line.

2010 census
As of the census of 2010 there were ten people (down 52% since 2000), five households (down 50%), and three families (down 57%) residing in the borough. There were six housing units (down 62.5%) at an average density of 0.4 units per square mile (.015 units/km2). The racial makeup of the borough was 100% white.

Of the five households, none had children under the age of 18. Two (40%) were married couples living together, one (20%) had a female householder with no spouse present, and two (40%) were non-families. One of those non-family households was an individual, and none had someone living alone who was 65 years of age or older. The average household size was 2.0 persons, and the average family size was 2.33 persons.

There were no residents under the age of 18, one aged 25–29, one aged 50–54, one aged 55–59, four aged 60–64, two aged 70–74, and one aged 80–84. The median age was 62.5 years, and there were five females and five males in total.

2020 census
As of the census of 2020, there were five people residing in the borough. The racial makeup of the borough was 80% white, and 20% Asian.

One resident (20%) was under the age of 18.

Public services
The borough is served by a small group of volunteer firefighters operating one fire engine that is more than 30 years old. The fire company ambulance was given to the nearby Wilburton Fire Company in Conyngham Township in 2012.

The Centralia Municipal Building still stands, along with its attached fire station garage. By the early 2010s, the building had fallen into disrepair, but new siding was installed in 2012. The building hosts the annual Centralia Cleanup Day, when volunteers collect illegally dumped trash in the area. Although past cleanup days avoided fire-impacted areas, the 2018 cleanup included areas around the landfill and the abandoned section of PA Route 61, since nicknamed Graffiti Highway. In April 2021, volunteers planted 250 apple trees around Centralia to restore the town's ecosystem and wildlife habitats.

The town's Ukrainian Catholic church, the Assumption of the Blessed Virgin Mary, remains in use and attracts worshippers from surrounding towns including people who were once residents of the town. A geological survey found there was solid rock, not coal, under the church so it is not in danger of collapse due to the fire. An Eastern Orthodox cemetery, the Saints Peter & Paul Church and Cemetery, still stands on the south-west outskirts of Centralia.

In popular culture

Centralia has been used as a model for many different fictional ghost towns and manifestations of Hell. Prominent examples include Dean Koontz's Strange Highways and David Wellington's Vampire Zero.

Screenwriter Roger Avary researched Centralia while working on the screenplay for the Silent Hill film adaptation.

The 1982 PBS documentary Centralia Mine Fire contains interviews with residents and relates the story of the mine fire.

The 1987 film Made in U.S.A. opens in Centralia and the surrounding coal region of Pennsylvania.

Author Bill Bryson described Centralia as "the strangest, saddest town I believe I have ever seen" in his 1998 travel book A Walk in the Woods.

The 2007 documentary The Town That Was is about the history of the town and its current and former residents.

Centralia had a segment entitled "City on Fire" on the Travel Channel television series America Declassified which aired in 2013.

The Centralia story was explored in the documentary segment "Dying Embers" from public radio station WNYC's Radiolab.

The American history comedy podcast The Dollop featured an episode in 2015 discussing Centralia.

The setting of the 1991 film Nothing but Trouble starring Chevy Chase and Dan Aykroyd was set in a fictional town "Valkenvania" based on Centralia.

The song "Perpetual Flame of Centralia", featured on the 2021 album Sinner Get Ready by Lingua Ignota, derives both its title and lyrical themes from the town and its mine fire.

See also

 Coal seam fires
 Brennender Berg (Saarland, Germany)
 Burning Mountain (New South Wales, Australia)
 Darvaza gas crater (Derweze, Turkmenistan)
 Jharia (India)
 New Straitsville mine fire
 Smoking Hills (Northwest Territories, Canada)
 Arkwright Town
 Involuntary park
 Love Canal, Niagara Falls, New York
 Namie, Fukushima
 Picher, Oklahoma
 Pripyat, Ukraine
 Times Beach, Missouri
 Wittenoom, Western Australia

Further reading
 DeKok, David. Unseen Danger: A Tragedy of People, Government, and the Centralia Mine Fire, University of Pennsylvania Press, .
 DeKok, David. Fire Underground: The Ongoing Tragedy of the Centralia Mine Fire, Globe Pequot, October 2009, .
 Jacobs, Renee. Slow Burn: A Photodocument of Centralia, Pennsylvania, University of Pennsylvania Press, 1986, .
 Johnson, Deryl B. Images of America: Centralia, Arcadia Publishing, 2004, .
 Kroll-Smith, J. Stephen, and Couch, Stephen.  The Real Disaster Is Above Ground: A Mine Fire and Social Conflict, University Press of Kentucky, January 1990, .
 Pitta, Terra. Catastrophe: A Guide to World's Worst Industrial Disasters [Chapter 3: Pennsylvania Coal Mine Fire, Centralia (May 1962)], Alpha Editions, July 2015, .
 Quigley, Joan. The Day the Earth Caved in: An American Mining Tragedy, Random House, 2007, .

External links

 Fifty years of fire in the abandoned US town of Centralia, BBC News, August 8, 2012
 Tour The Pennsylvania Ghost Town That's Been Burning For 50 Years, Business Insider, May 27, 2012
Centralia: ghost town church stronger than the fire
 The Town That Was, a 70-minute SnagFilms.com video

References

Bloomsburg–Berwick metropolitan area
Boroughs in Columbia County, Pennsylvania
Coal towns in Pennsylvania
Ghost towns in Pennsylvania
Environmental disasters in the United States
Environmental disaster ghost towns
Destroyed towns
Persistent natural fires
Municipalities of the Anthracite Coal Region of Pennsylvania
Populated places established in 1841
1841 establishments in Pennsylvania